Tommy Daniel John Conway (born 6 August 2002) is a professional footballer who plays as a forward for Bristol City. Born in England, he is a youth international for Scotland.

Career
Conway joined the youth academy of Bristol City at the age of 7. He began his senior career on loan with Yate Town in 2019–20, before joining Bath City on loan in October 2020. He made his professional debut with Bristol City in a 3–1 Championship loss to Coventry City on 5 April 2021. He scored his first professional goal in a 4-1 loss to Millwall on 1 May 2021.

An impressive start to the 2022–23 season saw Conway break into the first-team and was rewarded with the EFL Young Player of the Month award for August 2022.

International career

Born in Taunton in England, Conway is of Scottish descent through a grandparent. He was first selected for the Scotland under-21 squad in September 2022.

Career statistics

Honours
Individual
EFL Young Player of the Month: August 2022

References

External links
 
 BCFC Profile

2002 births
Living people
Sportspeople from Taunton
Scottish footballers
Scotland under-21 international footballers
English footballers
Anglo-Scots
Association football forwards
Bristol City F.C. players
Yate Town F.C. players
Bath City F.C. players
English Football League players
National League (English football) players
Southern Football League players